This article displays the rosters for the teams competing at the EuroBasket Women 2017. Each team had to submit 12 players.

Group A

Czech Republic
The final squad was announced on 14 June 2017.

Hungary
The roster was announced on 11 June 2017.

Spain
The roster was announced on 14 June 2017.

}

Ukraine

Group B

Belarus
The roster was announced on 15 June 2017.

Italy
The roster was announced on 15 June 2017.

Slovakia
The roster was announced on 10 June 2017.

Turkey

Group C

France
The roster was announced on 15 June 2017.

Greece
The roster was announced on 13 June 2017.

Serbia
The roster was announced on 13 June 2017.

Slovenia
The roster was announced on 15 June 2017.

}

Group D

Belgium
The roster was announced on 15 June 2017.

Latvia
The roster was announced on 12 June 2017.

Montenegro

Russia
The roster was announced on 13 June 2017.

References

External links
Official website

Squads
EuroBasket Women squads